The Stour Valley Path is a  long-distance footpath in Suffolk, England, from Newmarket  to Cattawade , a village near Manningtree.

The path follows the catchment area of the River Stour. The majority of the route forms part of European Path E2. It connects with the Icknield Way Path, St Edmund Way, the Stour and Orwell Walk and the Essex Way.

References

Footpaths in Suffolk
Long-distance footpaths in England